Trevanion is a historic home located at Uniontown, Carroll County, Maryland, United States. It was listed on the National Register of Historic Places in 1977.

Trevanion is a -story brick dwelling with an asymmetrical central hall plan with a tower. The original 1817 house was converted in 1855 to the "villa style" then popular in America, incorporating a combination of Italianate and Gothic architecture elements. Reflecting this is a brick tower and an adjoining gable end projection. In 1857, a -story wing was added. "Trevanion" is a family name and a term meaning "the meeting of streams" in Welsh.

Trevanion was listed on the National Register of Historic Places in 1977.

References

External links
, including photo from 2006, at Maryland Historical Trust

Houses on the National Register of Historic Places in Maryland
Houses in Carroll County, Maryland
Houses completed in 1817
Italianate architecture in Maryland
Welsh-American culture in Maryland
Uniontown, Maryland
National Register of Historic Places in Carroll County, Maryland